Sir Rodney Errey Lawrence Williams,  (born 2 November 1947) is the current and 4th Governor-General of Antigua and Barbuda.

Early life
Rodney is the son of Ernest Emmanuel Williams, the former Antigua Labour Party (ALP) parliamentary representative for the St Paul constituency and Irene B. Williams, a professional educator in Antigua and Barbuda.

Education 
Williams attended the Antigua Grammar School in St. John's, upon graduating he taught at his alma mater for a year. He then studied medicine at the University of the West Indies, Mona, where he received his MBBS degree in Medicine and Surgery in 1976. From 1978, after completing his Internship at the Queen Elizabeth Hospital in Barbados, he pursued his private medical practice in Antigua & Barbuda.

Early career 
Rodney entered politics in 1984 as the Member of Parliament for the St Paul constituency, that had been previously represented by his father. Between 1992 and 2004, he served in the cabinet as a minister, holding variously or jointly the portfolios of education, culture, technology, economic development, tourism, and environment. He represented St Paul up to 2004 when he lost his seat in the 2004 general election, when his Antigua Labour Party lost to the United Progressive Party.

Minister of Education, Culture and Technology 
After the Antigua Labour Party's victory at the 1994 General Elections, Prime Minister Lester Bird appointed Williams as Minister of Education, Culture and Technology. He would retain this post until the end of his political career in 2004. 

William's most controversial decision while being Minister of Education was his decision to introduce to Parliament the Board of Education Act, which introduced the Education Levy. The role of this statutory body was to provide finances for the stationery and physical supplies needed by public schools across the country. When the Bill was first tabled in the House of Representatives opposition forces marched in the high streets of St. John's, the capital city.

Governor-General

Rodney was sworn into office on 14 August 2014 as the 4th Governor General of Antigua and Barbuda.

Honours and awards
On 30 August 2014, Williams was appointed a Knight Grand Cross of the Order of St Michael and St George (GCMG) by Queen Elizabeth II in the 2014 Special Honours. 

In November 2014, he received the Gold Benemerenti Medal of the Sacred Military Constantinian Order of St. George and was invested as a Knight Grand Cross of the Royal Order of Francis I by Prince Carlo, Duke of Castro. On 22 December 2014, Williams was made a Knight of the Order of Saint John (KStJ), also in the 2014 Special Honours.

In May 2019, Williams was awarded an honorary PhD degree from St. Mary's College of Maryland,. 

In January 2021, he received an honorary DSc degree from the University of the West Indies.

References

External links

Official Government Website

Governors-General of Antigua and Barbuda
1947 births
Living people
Knights Grand Cross of the Order of St Michael and St George
Recipients of the Order of the Nation (Antigua and Barbuda)
People from Saint Paul Parish, Antigua